Maha Al-Saati (also known as Maha Zeini Al-Saati, Arabic: مها الساعاتي) is a Saudi Arabian female filmmaker,  university assistant professor and graduate of Simon Fraser University who has taught both in Vancouver, Canada and Saudi Arabia. Her academic research covers the representation of architectural spaces, education through the use of film, and the influence of religion and culture on media. She is also an alum of the TIFF filmmaker lab 2020, TIFF Writers Studio 2021, and recipient of the TIFF Share Her Journey award 2020. She is of mixed Arab and Uzbek heritage.

Themes & Style in Films 
Al-Saati's style is experimental, uses satire and she mentions she is inspired by American culture, 90s MTV music videos and consumerist culture, in addition to old Warner Brothers' cartoons such as Bugs Bunny and Tom & Jerry. She explores issues of religion, race and culture and her films have played in genre and fantasy festivals.

Her film, "Fear: Audibly" (2017) is about a girl's fear of the trumpet of doom which will end the world. The film reflects a religious period in Saudi Arabia between the 1980s and 1990s. Its dependence on sound is influenced by the Islamic restriction on visual depictions, often depending on oral narrations distributed through cassette tapes. She is influenced by Slavoj Žižek's Psychoanalytic description of sound as a disembodied entity floating unnaturally like a ghost.

Her film Hair: The Story of Grass (2018) is about the beauty standards regarding body hair in the Arab World. It critiques the treatment of the mentally ill, gender roles and the culture of consumerism. This film has won Al-Saati the Hollywood Foreign Press Association (HFPA) residency award of 2021 and has played at Fantastic Fest and Slamdance Film Festival.

Al-Saati collaborated with American electronic opera composer Alice Shields on to compose the music for Cycle of Apples (2019). The film was also featured by The Arab Film and Media Institute (AFMI) screening at The Academy of Motion Picture Arts and Sciences. The film shows her influence by classical Disney cartoons, as she traps her female protagonists on an island waiting for a prince to choose a bride. In a fantasy setting, the film takes a sinister look at these old fairytales, and addresses the gender imbalance while musing at death and the afterlife with a talking ram. The short film was based on a 1-minute looping version titled "Eat Me: Cycle of Apples" which was featured in the TIFFxInstagram competition of 2018.

Her feature film in development "A Trip to Disney" (later known as Hejj to Wonderland, Pilgrim in Wonderland)  is about a woman who travels from Saudi to Wonderland, North America, only to find out she is abandoned by her prince. Its themes explores themes of capitalism and commercialization that is disguised through fairytales. The film is told in a comedic tone, and has received development support from El Gouna Film Festival, Red Sea Film Fund and also featured in Nouveau Marché of Festival du nouveau cinéma.

Racial Bullying in Film 
Al-Saati collaborated with a number of black Saudi talents, including Saudi writer/actor Motasem Nasser, and Saudi  model "Saad Mo Saud", to create a short film that explore racism in a 1980s Saudi Arabia. The short film is called "VHS Tape Replaced" (2022), and features a young black man (played by Nasser) who mimics Crown, an 80s iconic singer inspired by Prince (musician), to win the love of a girl, following an 80s romantic comedy film formula. Nasser discusses how they explored the topic of racial bullying: “As a black young man, I understand very well what it means to be bullied by others because of your color". The choice of a musical black character "Prince" from the 80s is used with nostalgic stylistic choices to raise the awareness about race and being and being black in Saudi Arabia. The film played at the shorts competition at the 2nd edition of The Red Sea International Film Festival, and stars Saudi actress Sarah Taibah, who won The Chopard Rising Star Award for her her notable work. The film also features Aisha Al Rifaie (star of Faiza Ambah's film: Nour Shams (2021). The film music was also composed by Austrian violinist Yury Revich.

Filmography

References 

Living people
Saudi Arabian women film directors
Arab film directors
Simon Fraser University alumni
Year of birth missing (living people)